José Ramiro Suárez Soruco (born March 16, 1939, in Cochabamba, Bolivia) is a former Executive President of Yacimientos Petrolíferos Fiscales Bolivianos YPFB during the government of Eduardo Rodríguez Veltzé.

He has held a range of leadership and research positions throughout the southern cone, working for YPFB, the Organization of American States, and a range of companies and national governments. Since 1988 he is a Member of the Bolivian National Academy of Sciences.

A widely published researcher, Suarez is an expert on paleozoic biostratigraphy, invertebrate paleontology, national parks, wild life sanctuaries, and paleoecology. Among other distinctions in 1997 he received the Robert Dott Memorial Award from the American Association of Petroleum Geologists.  
 
Between 1965 and 1968 Suarez was an assistant of Biostratigraphy and Paleontology I in the University of Buenos Aires, Argentina.  In 1969 he was a professor of Zoology in the Universidad Mayor de San Andrés. In 1970, he was an educational investigator of OAS at the University of Santiago in Chile.  Between 1976 and 1980 Suarez was a professor of Geology (GLG-99) in the Universidad Gabriel René Moreno, Santa Cruz de la Sierra Bolivia; between 1978 and 1979 professor of Biology 116, and since 2000 occupied a professorship of Geology. (ECL-l11) in the Environment Engineering career at the Universidad Católica Boliviana in Cochabamba, Bolivia.

He founded the Alcide D'Orbigny Natural History Museum in Cochabamba, and intensively collaborated the first years of its operation among some voluntaries and friends of nature. Later on the museum has been relied to the public university administration.

Today he is retired from Geology, Petroleum and all business activities, but he still researches on his own about Human Evolution and Astronomy. His residence place is fixed to Cochabamba.

References
 AAPG Robert Dott Memorial Award
 Academia Nacional de Ciencias site 
 Presidencia de Bolivia 
 Fosibol Paleontologos en Bolivia 
 FosiBol Contactos 
 GeoTIMES 1997
 Freiberger Geologie 
 IFEA Fosiles and Facies de Bolivia 
 NHBS Fosiles and Facies II
 UNESCO Comité Boliviano de Correlación Geológica
 Geoscientific Cooperation with Latinamerica
 Museo Alcides D'Orbingy 
 Fundacion para las Ciencias

External links
 

1939 births
Living people
Bolivian scientists
People from Cochabamba